Histoire complète de la Révolution, depuis 1789 jusqu'en 1814 (Complete History of the Revolution, from 1789 until 1814) is a history book about the French Revolution written in 1838 by French journalist and historian Albert Laponneraye.

Overview
The Complete History of the Revolution was the culmination of years of research conducted by Laponneraye, a socialist of the Neo-Babouvist tendency who considered the French Revolution to be a triumph of the people that should serve as a foundation for what he considered a necessary proletarian revolution, as he deemed the original revolution incomplete. Laponneraye's research into the French Revolution produced several important and popular works, of which the Complete History of the Revolution was no exception. It sold very well and was reissued several times during the period of 1838 to 1840.

See also
The French Revolution: A History
The Old Regime and the Revolution

References

1838 non-fiction books
19th-century history books
History books about the French Revolution